The Australia women's national cricket team toured New Zealand in March 2008. They first played against New Zealand in one Twenty20 International, which they lost by 4 wickets. The two sides then played in five One Day Internationals, which were competed for the Rose Bowl. Australia won the series 3–2.

Squads

Only WT20I

WODI Series

1st ODI

2nd ODI

3rd ODI

4th ODI

5th ODI

References

External links
Australia Women tour of New Zealand 2007/08 from Cricinfo

Women's international cricket tours of New Zealand
2008 in New Zealand cricket
Australia women's national cricket team tours